Energy storage device may refer to:
 Electric double-layer capacitor e.g. in automobiles
 Any energy storage device, e.g.
 Flywheel energy storage
 Rechargeable battery